Round Top is the third-highest mountain in Washington County, Oregon with an elevation of . From 1933 to 1946, the summit was the site of a fire lookout tower and cabin.

References

External links 

 
 
 

Mountains of the Oregon Coast Range
Landforms of Washington County, Oregon